Urbano Felicio (25 May 1582 – 1635) was a Roman Catholic prelate who served as Bishop of Policastro (1629–1635).

Biography
Urbano Felicio was born on 25 May 1582 in L'Aquila, Italy. On 14 March 1629, he was appointed by Pope Urban VIII as Bishop of Policastro. On 17 April 1629, he was consecrated bishop by Antonio Marcello Barberini, Cardinal-Priest of Sant'Onofrio. He served as Bishop of Policastro until his death in 1635.

References

External links and additional sources
 (for Chronology of Bishops) 
 (for Chronology of Bishops) 

1635 deaths
17th-century Italian Roman Catholic bishops
Bishops appointed by Pope Urban VIII
1582 births